The 2016 Asia Rugby Championship division tournaments refers to the divisions played within the annual international rugby union tournament for the Asian region. The Asia Rugby Championship (ARC) replaced the Asian Five Nations tournament in 2015. The main tournament is now contested by the top three teams in Asia. The other national teams in Asia compete in three divisions.

Teams
The teams involved in the division tournaments, with their world rankings prior to the competition in brackets:

Division 1
  (38) 
  (54)
  (58)
  (59) 

Division 2 
  (73)
  (75) 
  (83)
  (89)

Division 3

East
  (98)
  (NA)

West
  (NA)
  (NA) 
  UAE Shaheen (NA) 

West-Central
  (NA)
  (NA)
  (NA)

Notes
 Singapore was promoted to Division 1 prior to the scheduled start of competition to replace Kazakhstan, who withdrew from the tournament.

 Thailand was promoted to Division 2 prior to the scheduled start of competition to replace the Singapore team promoted to Division 1.

 Syria withdrew from Division 3 West prior to the scheduled start of competition and was replaced by the United Arab Emirates development side, the Shaheen.

 Brunei and China withdrew from Division 3 East shortly before the competition and the division was reduced to a single match

Division 1

The Division 1 tournament was held in Kuala Lumpur, Malaysia. All times are Malaysia Time (UTC+8)

Malaysia won the Division 1 tournament giving them a promotion chance by playing a match against the third placers of the main tournament in a playoff dubbed as the Top 3 challenge. Malaysia did not choose to participate and will remain in Division 1 in the next edition.

Table

Fixtures

Round 1

Round 2

Round 3

Division 2

The Division 2 tournament was held in Tashkent, Uzbekistan. All times are Uzbekistan Time (UTC+5)

Fixtures

Semi-finals

3rd-place final

Final

Division 3 West

The Division 3 West tournament will be held in Amman, Jordan. All times are Arabia Standard Time (UTC+3).

Syria were originally scheduled to compete, but withdrew early in the year. They were replaced by the UAE's developmental side, the Shaheen.

Table

Fixtures

Division 3 West-Central

The Division 3 West-Central tournament will be held in Doha, Qatar. All times are Arabia Standard Time (UTC+3).

Table

Fixtures

Division 3 East

The Division 3 East tournament will be held at Queen Sirikit Stadium in Khlong Luang District, Thailand. All times are Indochina Time (UTC+7).

With the withdrawal of Brunei and China, Division III East became a one-off final between Laos and Indonesia

Fixtures

Final

References

2016
2016 in Asian rugby union
2016 rugby union tournaments for national teams